Volodymyr Volodymyrovych Borodianskyi (born 15 January 1974, Novyi Rozdil, Lviv Oblast, Ukraine) is a Ukrainian television manager, public figure, entrepreneur and politician. Minister of Culture, Youth and Sports of Ukraine (2019–2020), chairman of the board of STB (2004–2018), Director of StarLightMedia (2012–2018), Chairman of the Council for the Development of the National Cultural, Art and Museum complex "Mystetsky Arsenal".

Biography 
Volodymyr Borodianskyi was born on 15 January 1974 in the town of Novyi Rozdil, Lviv region. His father, Volodymyr Efimovych Borodianskyii, worked as Deputy General Director of Novorozdilsk Production Association "Sera".

Borodianskyi graduated from the Novorozdolsk secondary school No. 2. Media manager career.

Education 
In 1991, after graduating from school, he studied at the Faculty of Economics of the Lviv Agricultural Institute in Dublyany, Lviv region. Then he transferred to the Kyiv National Economic University at the Faculty of Finance and Economics with a degree in Finance and Credit. In 1997, he graduated from the Kyiv National Economic University.

Media manager career 
In 2004, he was elected chairman of the board of the STB.

From 2012 to the end of 2018 – the head of the StarlightMedia media group.

29 July 2019 President Zelensky appointed Borodianskyi Foreign Humanitarian Advisor. 

In 2021, Borodianskyii became a member of the Board of Directors of Media Group Ukraine. His responsibilities include developing changes that will increase the share of artistic and non-educational entertainment content and will ensure its economic efficiency.

Chairman of the board of the STB 
Under the leadership of Borodianskyii, STB strengthened his position on television. STB changed the vector from the information channel to cognitive-entertainment. 

In 2006, the "Golden Feather" was awarded to the news program Vikna Novyny, and in 2007 the program received the title "Favorite Teleports". In 2008, this title was departed to the program "Za Viknamy", and in 2009 – "Ukrayina maye talant".   

In 2007, 2009, 2010 and 2011, the Vikna Novyny became the winners of the Teletriumph Prize as the best news program on Ukrainian television. 

In 2008, STB first became the leader among Ukrainian television channels with a commercially attractive audience 14–49 according to GFK. 

While working on television, Borodianskyii popularized entertainment and social television projects on Ukrainian TV. Among them "Everybody Dance!", "Ukrayina maye talant", "X-Factor", "Weighted and happy" (The Biggest Loser), "I am shy of my body" (Embarrassing Bodies), "MasterChef Ukraine", and others.

On the Borodianskyi initiative, STB took on all expenses on the organization, conducting and broadcasting live ether of national selection for Eurovision.

StarlightMedia media group manager 
2012 – 2018 Borodianskyi was the head of the StarlightMedia media group. From 2012 under his leadership, there were nationwide media group channels: ICTV, STB, new channel, Oce TV, M1, M2.

In 2013, Borodianskyi offered to start the initiative "Pure Sky" – to legally place a video content created by a media group in a special player. 

Since 2014, StarlightMedia since Borodianskyi has increased their own serial production. Among more than 50 successful implemented projects: Lesya + Roma's, Cossacks. Absolutely false history, Variaty, Khto zverkhu, Revizor. In general, the company's products in traditional ether and specialized sites are watching up to 98% of the population of Ukraine.

In 2015, a new Starlight Entertainment division appeared in the structure of the media group, which is engaged in theatrical ideas, concerts, holidays and other entertainment events. 

In 2016, Starlightmedia broke the record of telepositions. Their share amounted to 30%, which became the highest in the last three years. The leaders among the TV channels were STB with the programs "X-Factor-7", "Masterchef-6", "Weighted and Happy-6", ICTV with a Diesel-Show project and Novyi Kanal with programs "Supermodel in Ukrainian", "Khto zverkhu" and "Revizor". 

In 2018, Volodymyr Borodianskyi presented the project "Transformation" of optimizing management processes in media holding. The project was aimed at improving the internal management and for 5 years to make the StarlightMedia media group profitable.

#KinoKrayina 
In 2015, Borodianskyi united the largest Ukrainian television and film holdings in the initiative group #Kinokraїna to create a profitable and competitive branch of the production of serials and audience in Ukraine. The group was able to undergo the adoption of the law "On state support of cinematography", which entered into force in 2017.

As Minister of Culture, Youth and Sports of Ukraine 
V. Borodianskyi was appointed Minister of Culture of Youth and Sport on 2 September 2019.

Being a post, Borodianskyi declared the necessity to make a move in Ukrainian, announced establishing of the Fund for the development of information space, the creation of the mobility program for schoolchildren, which provides for the journey of students in Ukraine at the expense of the state budget  and the creation of electronic library. 

Under Borodianskyi, online courses of Ukrainian and Crimean Tatar languages for the Crimean Tatars (children and adults) were established, a separate program for Crimean Tatar projects and initiatives in the Ukrainian Cultural Fund was opened.

Interesting Facts 
Volodymyr Borodianskyi spoke with the idea of creating a modern adaptation of Ivan Nechuy-Levytsky novella "Kaidash Family", which turned into the series "Catch Kaidash".

Borodianskyii has made talent show on Ukrainian television popular. The first such project was the show "Dance everything" (adaptation of the British SO YOU-THINK YOU CAN DANCE format?) the final release of which in December 2008 was watched by every fourth viewer of Ukraine. "I am shy of my body" – the only teleproject of this format in the post-Soviet space.

See also 
 Honcharuk Government

References

External links 

 
 

1974 births
Living people
People from Novyi Rozdil
Kyiv National Economic University alumni
Ukrainian television managers
Ukrainian chief executives
STB (TV channel) people
21st-century Ukrainian businesspeople
Ukrainian producers
Culture ministers of Ukraine
Youth and sport ministers of Ukraine
21st-century Ukrainian politicians